Lionel Cartwright is the debut studio album by the American country music singer of the same name. It was released in March 1989 (see 1989 in country music) on MCA Records. The album includes the singles "You're Gonna Make Her Mine", "Like Father, Like Son", "Give Me His Last Chance" and "In My Eyes". These latter three singles all charted in the Top 40 on the Billboard country singles charts.

Dan Cooper of Allmusic rated the album four-and-a-half stars out of five, saying that out of Cartwright's three albums, it was "still his best."

Track listing
All songs written by Lionel Cartwright except "Like Father Like Son", written by Paul Overstreet and Don Schlitz.
"Fallin' Again" – 3:29
"Like Father Like Son" – 3:28
"You're Gonna Make Her Mine" – 2:32
"A Little Lesser Blue" – 3:17
"In My Eyes" – 4:14
"Give Me His Last Chance" – 4:12
"That's Why They Call It Falling" – 2:57
"Blue Fiddle Waltz" – 3:26
"She Never Saw Love" – 3:23
"Let the Hard Times Roll" – 3:20

Chart performance

Personnel
As listed in liner notes.

 Eddie Bayers - drums
 Lionel Cartwright - mandolin, acoustic guitar, piano, fiddle, lead vocals, background vocals
 Pat Flynn - acoustic guitar
 Paul Franklin - steel guitar
 Steve Gibson - electric guitar
 Vince Gill - background vocals
 David Hungate - bass guitar
 John Barlow Jarvis - piano
 Mac McAnally - acoustic guitar, background vocals 
 Mark O'Connor - mandolin, viola
 Michael Rhodes - bass guitar 
 Tom Robb - bass guitar
 Matt Rollings - piano
 Steuart Smith - piano, electric guitar, acoustic guitar
 Harry Stinson - drums, background vocals

References

1989 debut albums
Albums produced by Tony Brown (record producer)
Lionel Cartwright albums
MCA Records albums